Battista de' Canonici (died 1510) was a professor of law at the University of Bologna, and Roman Catholic prelate who served as Bishop of Faenza (1478–1510).

Biography
Battista di Francesco de' Canonici was a native of Bologna.

He was ordained a priest, time and circumstances unknown. It is said he was a member of the Order of Saint Benedict.

From 1464 to 1467 he was professor of Canon Law at the University of Bologna. He became a Canon and Prebend of the Cathedral Chapter of S. Petronio in Bologna, a post he held for eight years. In 1472 he was also named Canon of the Collegiate Church of S. Pietro. He was also Abbot commendatory of santi Nabore e Felice outside the walls of Bologna. On 26 February 1501, Bishop Battista signed a grant which he issued from his residence at Ss. Nabore e Felice, indicating that he was still the Abbot Commendatory.

On 5 Oct 1478, he was appointed by Pope Sixtus IV as Bishop of Faenza. He was the first bishop of Faenza of Bolognese origin. His predecessor was the last bishop of Faenza to be elected by the Cathedral Chapter. He served as Bishop of Faenza until his death. While bishop, he was the principal co-consecrator of Nicolò Maria d'Este, Bishop of Adria (1487).

He drew up and registered his Last Will and Testament on 28 March 1510. He did not die on 5 Apr 1510, as alleged by Strozzi. A document survives dated 1 April 1510, which refers to Bishop Battista as already deceased.

References

Sources

 [highly inaccurate]

15th-century Italian Roman Catholic bishops
16th-century Italian Roman Catholic bishops
Bishops appointed by Pope Sixtus IV
1510 deaths
Academic staff of the University of Bologna